Shanghai News Radio ( [ʂaŋ xaj ɕin wən kwaŋ pwɔ]), which is also known as Shanghai People's Radio Station, is a news radio channel in Shanghai China, broadcasting at 990 AM and 93.4 FM, now owned by Shanghai Media Group and operated by SMG Radio Centre

Its callsign, Shanghai People's Radio Station, and its frequencies, 990 AM and 93.4 FM, were inherited from former Shanghai People's Radio Station.

External links
 Official website of Shanghai News Radio
  Official website of Shanghai East Radio Company

Radio stations in China
Shanghai Media Group